Table tennis at the 1976 Summer Paralympics consisted of 28 events, 17 for men and 11 for women.

Medal table

Medal summary

Men's events

Women's events

References 

 

1976 Summer Paralympics events
1976
Paralympics